Weixin may refer to:

 Weixin County, in Yunnan Province, China
 WeChat, called Weixin in Chinese, a mobile phone messaging service by Tencent
 Weixin, Shimen, a town in Shimen County, Hunan Province, China